Stinking Creek is a stream in Campbell County, Tennessee, in the United States.

Stinking Creek, a sulphur spring, was named on account of its naturally occurring unpleasant odor.

Another theory for the creek's name dates to 1779–1780. This was attributed to many animal deaths during an unusually cold winter and the resulting carrion stench the following spring.

See also
List of rivers of Tennessee

References

Rivers of Campbell County, Tennessee
Rivers of Tennessee